Artie Enlow Smith (born May 15, 1970) is a former professional American football defensive end in the National Football League (NFL) for the Cincinnati Bengals, San Francisco 49ers, and Dallas Cowboys. He played college football at Louisiana Tech University.

Early years
Smith attended Stillwater High School, where he was a two-time All-state selection at defensive end. He also played tight end and defensive tackle. He was a two-time All-conference selection in basketball.

He accepted a football scholarship from Louisiana Tech University. As a senior, he finished with 81 tackles. He had 12 tackles against the University of Alabama. He had 9 tackles and blocked a field goal against the University of South Carolina. 

He also  participated in track, where he was the Sun Belt Conference Discus throw champion as a junior in 1992.

Professional career

San Francisco 49ers
Smith was selected by the San Francisco 49ers in the fifth round (116th overall) of the 1993 NFL Draft. As a rookie, he played in 9 games and started in 2 at right defensive end. On September 15, 1994, he was part of the cuts made after 2 games, to make room to sign Deion Sanders and Charles Mann.

Cincinnati Bengals
On September 16, 1994, Smith was claimed off waivers by the Cincinnati Bengals and played in 7 games as a reserve defensive end. In 1995, he was a starter at right defensive end, right defensive tackle and left defensive tackle, registering 44 tackles and 2 sacks. The next year, he played in 16 games (12 starts), while registering 34 tackles. He was released on August 4, 1997.

New England Patriots
On March 11, 1998, he signed with the New England Patriots as a free agent after being out of football for a year. He was traded to the Dallas Cowboys in exchange for future considerations on August 25.

Dallas Cowboys
In 1998, he played a full season with the Dallas Cowboys as a reserve defensive tackle, posting 24 tackles, 7 quarterback pressures and one blocked field goal.

Kansas City Chiefs
On April 22, 1999, he was signed as a free agent by the Kansas City Chiefs. He was released on September 5.

References

1970 births
Living people
People from Stillwater, Oklahoma
Players of American football from Oklahoma
American football defensive ends
Louisiana Tech Bulldogs football players
San Francisco 49ers players
Cincinnati Bengals players
New England Patriots players
Dallas Cowboys players
Kansas City Chiefs players